The Tavernier Blue was the precursor diamond to the Blue Diamond of the French Crown (aka the French Blue). Subsequently, most scholars and historians believe that it was re-cut and, after a disappearance and reemergence into the public forum, was renamed the Hope Diamond. It is believed to have been a Type IIb diamond.

Diamond details
Weighing 112 3/16 old French carats, the crudely finished gem was described by the French gem dealer Jean-Baptiste Tavernier as being "violet" in color. and of perfect clarity. The diamond was certainly Indian in origin and likely sourced by Tavernier in 1666 at the Kollur mine in the Guntur district, Andhra Pradesh. The stone, only slightly finished at this time, was eventually cut to present a more diamond-like appearance, in 1775.

Background and history

Tavernier was a French traveler and trader who returned to France from India with many of the largest gems of the era.  He primarily sold merchandise to French royalty and the aristocracy. Tavernier sold the Tavernier Blue to Louis XIV of France for cash. He also received a Patent of Nobility as part of the sales price.  

The original stone was set into a cravat-pin in 1674, and became a central element in the elaborate Order of the Golden Fleece pendant in 1715. It and the fleece were placed into the French Crown Jewels in 1749. The Tavernier Blue was removed from the fleece and re-cut by court jeweler Jean Pitau into the 68-carat French Blue in 1775, on the orders of Louis XV.  It was then returned to the Crown Jewels. 

The French Blue was stolen from the French Crown Jewels in 1792 during the turbulence of the French Revolution. It is generally believed that after the theft, the stone was cut into the 45.52-carat Hope Diamond and several smaller stones in an attempt to prevent its proper identification. This provenance was accepted by many historians and gemologists for years and was supported by research with 3D imaging and prototyping technology in 2005.

Possible remnants
Another large blue diamond believed to have been taken from the Tavernier was originally set in a ring for Empress Maria Feodorovna, wife of Russian Emperor Paul I. It was given to the State Diamond Fund in 1860 by her daughter-in-law, the Empress Alexandra Feodorovna. Later, it was mounted into a stick pin. The 7.6-carat stone is preserved in the collection of the Alexander Palace in Tsarskoye Selo, near St Petersburg. The Russian stone's provenance as part of the Tavernier Blue is disputed.

See also
 List of diamonds

Notes

References

Externalink link

Diamonds originating in India
Blue diamonds
Individual diamonds